Belmont Park is an oceanfront historic amusement park located in the Mission Beach area of San Diego, California. The park was developed by sugar magnate John D. Spreckels and opened on July 4, 1925 as the Mission Beach Amusement Center. In addition to providing recreation and amusement, it also was intended as a way to help Spreckels sell land in Mission Beach. Located on the beach, it attracts millions of people each year.

The park's most iconic attraction is the historic Giant Dipper roller coaster, which is considered a local landmark.

History

The attractions and rides that remain from the original 1925 park include the Giant Dipper, a wooden roller coaster that is listed on the National Register of Historic Places. Another historic facility is The Plunge, an indoor swimming pool. The Plunge was originally a salt water pool called the Natatorium and was the largest salt-water pool in the world; it now contains fresh water. In 2013 the California Coastal Commission approved plans to remove a portion of a large mural by artist Wyland during planned renovations.  The plunge was closed in 2014 due to disrepair.  Plans to demolish and rebuild the Plunge were approved in January 2016. It reopened in 2019 over the Fourth of July weekend after a $12 million renovation.

In 2002, businessman/surfer Tom Lochtefeld bought the master lease for the property and started development of the Wave House.

In November 2012, Pacifica Enterprises LLC. acquired the park leasehold in a bankruptcy trustee sale. Pacifica Enterprises, along with Eat.Drink.Sleep, assumed operations of the park and started a restoration and revitalization of the park. Eat.Drink.Sleep's team of Brett Miller, Steve Smith and Justin Lopez developed and led the opening of new restaurants, Cannonball, South Mission Draft, Belmonty's Burgers and Hot Dog on a Stick and a remodel of Beach House Grill.

Controversies
In the early 1980s, the San Diego City Council led by then-Councilman Mike Gotch called for proposals to redevelop Belmont Park and clean up the area, which had fallen into disrepair and developed a seedy reputation. The city received five redevelopment bids but eventually decided not to take action at that time. Later the matter was reopened and the City's Real Estate Development Department was authorized to contact architect Paul Thoryk and developer Graham MacHutchin regarding their proposal since it was the only development that restored the Plunge, the city's historic public swimming pool. On June 24, 1986 the City Council voted 6 to 1 to grant an exclusive right to negotiate a lease on the site with Thoryk & MacHutchin who by then were joined by a subsidiary of San Diego Gas & Electric as a partner in Belmont Park Associates. The parties negotiated a lease, plans were completed and approved, and construction began including the demolition and reconstruction of the exterior walls of the Plunge building which did not meet earthquake code requirements. The redeveloped Belmont Park and Plunge Building reopened in the summer of 1988.

On November 3, 2010, Wave House Belmont Park LLC filed for Chapter 11 bankruptcy in US Bankruptcy Court (Bankruptcy Petition #: 10-19663-11) citing a 700% increase in rent owed to the City of San Diego as the reason. Tom Lochtefeld, Belmont Park Manager Member, alleges the city has breached its lease agreement. In 2011 Lochtefeld filed a $25 million lawsuit against the City of San Diego accusing the city of breach of contract and fraudulent misrepresentation for preventing him from completing a second major expansion of the park including adding a hotel. That suit was settled in November 2013 after Lochtefeld decided not to pursue the case against the city.

Current attractions
In addition to the iconic Giant Dipper, amusements include a Tilt-A-Whirl, a three-story drop tower (the "Vertical Plunge"), the Liberty Carousel, and the Beach Blaster. Newer attractions since 2016 include a Zip Line, a 3-level Sky Ropes obstacle course, a 7D Theater called Xanadu, and a 3-level Tron-themed Laser Tag arena. The park's rides, including the Giant Dipper, are operated by the San Diego Coaster Company.

Current Rides 
The park is typically open from 11 am until 10 pm or 11 pm. Current rides are as follows:

Current attractions are as follows:

Sky Ropes
Laser Tag
Xanadu 7D Theater
Lazer Maze
Tiki Town Adventure Golf
Zip Line
Rock Wall
Jungle Gems
Escapology

Restaurants
Restaurants in Belmont Park include Beach House Grill (formerly WaveHouse), Cannonball, Draft, Belmonty's Burgers, Hot Dog on a Stick, Sweet Shoppe, Dippin' Dots, Round Table Pizza, Icee, Wetzel's Pretzels, Beach Treats, and Dole Whip.

References in popular culture 
Much of the video for the song M+M's from the band Blink-182 is filmed at Belmont Park and Soma. The song was their lead single from their debut album Cheshire Cat (1995)

References

External links 

 

Amusement parks in California
Parks in San Diego
1925 establishments in California